Bleez is an anti-heroine and supervillain appearing in American comic books published by DC Comics. Created by writer Geoff Johns and artist Shane Davis, the character first appears in Final Crisis: Rage of the Red Lanterns #1 (December 2008).

Publication history
Created by writer Geoff Johns and Shane Davis, she made her first appearance in Final Crisis: Rage of the Red Lanterns #1, and has since featured prominently in several other Green Lantern related titles, especially in the Green Lantern: New Guardians series. She started out as a ruthless, feral villain but over time has gained control of her powers and become more of an anti-hero, occasionally siding with heroes such as the Green Lanterns.

She is one of the foremost members of the Red Lantern Corps, who was inducted after being abused and tortured by the Sinestro Corps, which also resulted in her wings being cut off. In the rebooted DC Comics universe of 2011's "The New 52", Bleez joined representatives of the seven Lantern Corps to form "The New Guardians", led by White Lantern Kyle Rayner. At times, Bleez has opposed Red Lantern Corps leader Atrocitus, and has even fought him for control of the Corps. In spite of this, she is a loyal member of the Red Lanterns, and usually serves as one of Atrocitus' chief enforcers.

Fictional character biography

Origin

Bleez was once a princess on the planet Havania, renowned for her great beauty. Many men sought her hand, but she rejected them all, often in an extremely rude and abrasive manner. Two of her suitors, especially humiliated, sought out a Sinestro Corpsman and tempted him with stories of Bleez's beauty. He went to Havania, where he murdered Bleez's mother and captured Bleez, taking her to Ranx the Sentient City. For some time during the events of the Sinestro Corps War, Bleez was raped and tortured by members of the Sinestro Corps, but managed to escape when Ranx came under attack during the Battle of Mogo. The Sinestro Corpsman who had originally abducted her pursued and caught her, and forced her to kiss him. As she was being pushed to her limits by this final indignity, a red ring found Bleez and inducted her into the Red Lantern Corps. Her blood was transformed into burning plasma, and she vomited it into the Corpsman's throat. Before he could recover, she killed him in a blind fury. Later, she was among the strike force that ambushed the Green Lanterns transporting Sinestro back to Korugar for execution.

Blackest Night
During the Blackest Night, Bleez and the Red Lantern Corps fought alongside the other Corps against the Black Lantern Anti-Monitor.

Brightest Day
During the Brightest Day, Guy Gardner and Ganthet made a pact with Atrocitus to search for the Emotional Entities in response to a prophecy seen by Gardner. Gardner was sent to patrol the Unknown Sectors for the Entities, and Atrocitus sent Bleez to "help" him. When Gardner attempted to have himself purified of the red energy of Odym, Bleez stopped him.

The New 52
In "The New 52" reboot of DC's continuity, Bleez was tasked with finding and recovering a red power ring that had mysteriously abandoned its bearer. This assignment led her to confront Green Lantern Kyle Rayner, who had been chosen by the wayward ring as its new bearer. Subsequently, Bleez, along with representatives of the other Lantern Corps (including Arkillo, Saint Walker, Fatality, Munk, and Glomulus) tracked Rayner to Oa, intending to take back the stolen Red Lantern ring. When they arrived on Oa, they became embroiled in a battle with the Guardians of the Universe, during which the Orange Lantern Corps attacked the Oan Citadel. As the battle escalated, Rayner ordered Munk of the Indigo Tribe to teleport the assembled Corps members away from Oa. They escaped to the planet of Okaara. When Saint Walker attempted to heal her with his blue power ring, Bleez fled and returned to Ysmault to report on what she had learned. When she arrived on Ysmault, she was unable to communicate her findings to Atrocitus, due to the immense rage clouding her mind. Frustrated, Atrocitus threw her into the Blood Ocean of Ysmault, an act that restored not only her memories, but also her self-control, thus enabling her to fully be in control of her actions and behaviour. She later rejoined the other New Guardians as they fought the Archangel Invictus at the Orrery. After Rayner convinced Invictus to let them go in exchange for assassinating Larfleeze, Bleez accompanied Rayner to Earth so that he could recharge his ring, which brought them into a brief conflict with Blue Beetle and an alien bounty hunter. Afterwards, she returned to Ysmault on unspecified business, only to be brought back to the team by Munk on Rayner's orders. She joined with the rest of the Guardians to defeat Larfleeze and Invictus, and was present when Sayd admitted to having stolen the six power rings to help Rayner learn to master the emotional spectrum so that he could save Ganthet. Like the other New Guardians, Bleez refused to have anything more to do with a team built on deceit and murder, and once again departed for Ysmault.

Red Lanterns
In the aftermath of the War of the Green Lanterns and the death of the rogue Guardian Krona, Atrocitus felt his rage dimming, and feared that he might be losing control of his Corps. He decided to uplift one of his Red Lanterns, making them almost his equal. He chose Bleez as his new second-in-command, and hurled her into the Blood Ocean to restore her intellect and memories. After she emerged from the ocean, he took her back to her home planet of Havania, where she confronted Count Liib and Baron Ghazz, the men who had been responsible for her kidnapping and torture by the Sinestro Corps. After killing Ghazz, she and Atrocitus disagreed over Liib's fate. Bleez wanted to leave him alive and hunt him down later, but Atrocitus, uninterested in her 'subtleties', simply killed him outright. Despite this initial clash, events seemed to progress smoothly. Bleez was able to regain some measure of control over the Red Lanterns, but Atrocitus came to believe that she was manipulating the Corps for her own ends. When Atrocitus decided to immerse three more Red Lanterns in the Blood Ocean to keep Bleez in check, she attempted to dissuade him, noting that the trauma of regaining their memories might drive them insane. After Krona's body disappeared from Ysmault, Atrocitus attacked Bleez, believing her to be responsible. She held her own against him, causing the other Red Lanterns to realize that Atrocitus was losing his rage and his focus. Bleez subsequently seized control of the Corps, leading them on a galaxy-wide hunt for Sinestro, whom she held ultimately responsible for her condition.

After the Red Lantern central power battery was poisoned by Abysmus, Bleez returned to Ysmault with her Red Lanterns, briefly coming into conflict with Atrocitus, who had been drawn back by the dying battery. After Atrocitus reasserted his leadership over the Corps, Bleez decided to confront the Star Sapphires, whom she believed to be responsible for the battery's destruction. Bleez led a squadron of Red Lanterns, including Rankorr, Zilius Zox, and Ratchet, to Zamaron to confront the Sapphires, only to be defeated and captured by them. The Star Sapphire Fatality attempted to convert Bleez into a Star Sapphire, using her violet ring to envelop Bleez in a crystalline dome. Bleez, in turn, attempted to poison Fatality with some of her own blood, in an effort to make her a Red Lantern. Fatality tried to make Bleez see that she could be redeemed by the violet light of love. Under the influence of the crystal, Bleez finally admitted that all her acts of vengeance had not brought her peace, and nearly accepted a violet ring from Fatality. Before she could take the ring, Atrocitus killed Abysmus and restored the central battery, whereupon Bleez's ring returned to full strength. She rejected the Star Sapphires and returned to Ysmault with her Red Lanterns.

During the events of Rise of the Third Army, Bleez was one of the first Red Lanterns to encounter the Third Army, when she and several other Reds were attacked by Third Army drones on the planet of Arhtky. While Atrocitus rallied the rest of the Corps to confront the Guardians and the First Lantern, he ordered Rankorr to return to Earth and kill Baxter, the man who was indirectly responsible for his transformation into a Red Lantern. Bleez chose to accompany Rankorr, to ensure that the deed was done properly. Rankorr quickly found Baxter, but hesitated to kill him. Bleez responded by poisoning Baxter with her napalm blood, which Rankorr interpreted as her attempt to prove that she was still worthy of being a Red Lantern after nearly accepting a Star Sapphire ring from Fatality. Bleez admitted that she had indeed been tempted by Fatality's offer, and that a part of her longed to be something other than a Red Lantern, but that there was no other path for her, or for him. She then attempted to seduce Rankorr so that she could obtain his blood, which would allow her to create light constructs. Rankorr rejected her and escaped, attempting to live life as a human. Bleez tracked him down and again attempted to take his blood, but she was interrupted by Atrocitus, who issued an order for all Red Lanterns to hunt down and kill him, as he now deemed himself responsible for the destruction of his homeworld. She joined the rest of the Corps in attacking Atrocitus, during which he finally experienced the true depth of his Corps' rage. Declaring himself 'reborn', Atrocitus led the Red Lanterns to Oa to destroy the Guardians for good. They arrived at the climax of the battle with Volthoom, and aided in his defeat. In the aftermath of the battle, Bleez led the Red Lanterns back to Ysmault, where they found the Four Inversions attempting to destroy the central power battery. Their dark magic nearly defeated the assembled Lanterns, but Bleez was able to withstand their sorcery, and they fled. Skallox suggested that she ought to assume leadership of the Corps, but before she could decide one way or the other, Atrocitus returned to the planet, and she re-pledged her loyalty to him.

DC Rebirth
In "DC Rebirth", Bleez was a Red Lantern that accompanied Atrocitus and the Red Lantern Corps to Earth, where the Hell Tower had taken root. There the Red Dawn would begin, terraforming Earth into a new Red Lantern homeworld to save them from extinction. Upon arrival, she was sent by Atrocitus to attack Simon Baz and Jessica Cruz, keeping them from destroying the Hell Tower. After engaging, she quickly defeated Jessica and almost killed Simon, though Jessica blasted her with a power blast. An enraged Bleez blasted Jessica through a building, and proceeded to continue killing Simon, but the latter managed to use his willpower to cure her of the rage. She was horrified by her deeds and was about to relapse into rage to punish herself when Simon managed to convince her to begin a new life. Then a recovered Jessica attacked her, and she flew off in a rage, hiding from both the Red Lantern Corps and the Green Lantern Corps.

Powers and abilities

Bleez wears a red power ring, from which she derives all of her abilities. The ring channels the red light of rage, and grants her most of the same abilities as other power rings, including flight, enhanced strength, and forcefield generation. The ring has also transformed her blood into a fiery, highly corrosive fluid, referred to as 'napalm' by the Red Lanterns. She can regurgitate this napalm as an offensive weapon; it is capable of eating through nearly any known material, destroying Black Lanterns faster than they can regenerate, and corrupting other power rings beyond repair. Since the ring has replaced her heart, she cannot remove it without risking death by cardiac arrest. She is also vulnerable to blue and violet light, which can reverse the effects of a red ring. Due to being immersed in the Blood Ocean of Ysmault, she has regained her intellect and her memories, unlike many of the other Red Lanterns.

In other media

Television

 Bleez appears in Green Lantern: The Animated Series, voiced by Grey DeLisle.
 Bleez appears in Justice League Action, voiced by Rachel Kimsey.
 Bleez makes a cameo appearance in the DC Super Hero Girls episode "#RageCat".

Film
Bleez appears in DC Super Hero Girls: Intergalactic Games, voiced by Stephanie Sheh.

Video games
 Bleez appears in DC Universe Online.
 Bleez appears as a playable character in Lego Batman 3: Beyond Gotham, voiced by Erica Luttrell.
 Bleez appears in Atrocitus' ending in Injustice 2.
 Bleez appears as a playable character in DC Unchained.
 Bleez appears as a summonable character in Scribblenauts Unmasked: A DC Comics Adventure.

Miscellaneous
Bleez appears in DC Super Hero Girls, voiced by Stephanie Sheh.

References

DC Comics aliens
DC Comics characters with superhuman strength
DC Comics demons
DC Comics extraterrestrial supervillains
DC Comics female superheroes
Green Lantern characters
Characters created by Geoff Johns
Comics characters introduced in 2008
DC Comics female supervillains